Day of the Lone Wolf is the third album from singer-songwriter Astrid Williamson which she also produced. The album title refers to the date of her birth (28 November), which is known as the Day of the Lone Wolf in the astrological book, The Secret Language Of Birthdays.

Reception

The Guardian suggested that the album was 'oozes song-writing class..... (with) brave and powerful confessionals' with The Skinny noting a "haunting quality hanging over the album".

Track listing 
 Siamese
 Superman 2
 Intro
 Reach 
 Amarylis
 True Romance
 Carlotta
 Shhh...
 Tonight
 Another Twisted Thing
 Forgive Me
 Only Heaven Knows

Personnel 
 Astrid Williamson - vocals, guitar, organ, piano, synth, Wurlitzer, string arrangements
 Richard Yale - bass guitar
 Simon Pearson - drums
 Ruth Gottlieb - violin
 Neil Evans - guitar
 Mark Treffel - organ
 Sarah Wilson - cello
 Christian Parsons - drums and percussion
 Dan Burke - guitar and organ
Written, arranged and produced by Astrid Williamson

References

External links 

2006 albums
Astrid Williamson albums